Joseph Benson Gilder (June 29, 1858 – December 9, 1936) was an American editor.  He was the brother of Richard Watson Gilder and Jeannette Leonard Gilder and the explorer William Henry Gilder.

Biography
Gilde was the son of the clergyman William Henry Gilder. He was born in Flushing, New York, studied two years at the United States Naval Academy, and for some time was engaged in newspaper work in Newark, N. J. and New York City. In 1881, with his sister, he founded The Critic, of which he was coeditor until 1906 when publication of The Critic ended.

Gilder was literary advisor to the Century Company (1895–1902); helped organize the University Settlement House of New York; in 1902–04 was United States dispatch agent at London; and in 1910–11 was editor of the New York Times "Review of Books".

He edited: 
James Russell Lowell's Impressions of Spain (1899) 
Andrew Carnegie's Gospel of Wealth (1900) 
The American Idea (1902) 
Addresses of John Hay (1906) 
Essays from the Critic (1882) (with his sister) 
Authors at Home (1889)

Notes

References

External links
 
 

1858 births
1936 deaths
American book editors
American male journalists
The New York Times editors